Gongshi, also known as scholar's rocks or viewing stones, are naturally occurring or shaped rocks which are traditionally appreciated by Chinese scholars. The term is related to the Korean suseok and the Japanese suiseki.

Scholars' rocks can be any color, and contrasting colors are not uncommon. The size of the stone can also be quite varied: scholars' rocks can weigh hundreds of pounds or less than one pound. The term also identifies stones which are placed in traditional Chinese gardens.

History
In the Tang dynasty, a set of four important qualities for the rocks were recognized.  They are: thinness (瘦 shòu), openness (透 tòu), perforations (漏 lòu), and wrinkling (皺 zhòu).

Gongshi influenced the development of Korean suseok and Japanese suiseki.

Sources

There are three main Chinese sources for these stones.
 Lingbi stone (Lingbishi) (Chinese: 灵璧石) from Lingbi, Anhui province, limestone
 Taihu stone (Taihushi) (Chinese: 太湖石) from Lake Tai, Jiangsu province, limestone
 Yingde stone (Yingshi or Yingdeshi) (Chinese: 英石 or 英德石) from Yingde, Guangdong province, limestone

The geological conditions needed for the formation of stones are also present at some other sites.

Formation
Scholar's stones are generally karstic limestone. Limestone is water-soluble under some conditions. Dissolution pitting dissolves hollows in the limestone. On a larger scale, this causes speleogenesis (when caves dissolve in limestone bedrock). On a still larger scale, the dissolved caves collapse, gradually creating karst topography, such as the famous landscapes of Guilin in the South China Karst.

As rocks are broadly fractal (geology journals require a scale to be included in images of rocks), the small rocks can resemble the larger landscape.

Aesthetics

The aesthetics of a scholar's rock is based on subtleties of color, shape, markings, surface, and sound.  Prized qualities include:
 awkward or overhanging asymmetry
 resonance or ringing when struck
 representation or resemblance to mountainous landscapes, particularly these believed to be inhabited by immortal beings or figure
 texture
 moistness or glossy surface

The stone may be displayed on a rosewood pedestal that has been carved specifically for the stone. The stones are a traditional subject of Chinese paintings.

Gallery

See also

References

Further reading
 Little, Stephen, Spirit stones of China, the Ian and Susan Wilson collection of Chinese stones, paintings, and related scholars' objects, Chicago, Art Institute of Chicago, 1999,

External links

 Visuals and examples of scholar rocks
 Galleries of scholar rocks
 Books on scholars' rocks
  Chinese scholar's rock history, an introductory historical background
 Classification of Chinese scholar's rocks
  Scholar's rock at Metropolitan Museum of Art

Outdoor sculptures in China
Chinese art
Chinese gardening styles
Rock art in China
Garden ornaments